The following is a list of state routes in Nevada shorter than  in length. Most of these highways are short state-maintained sections of longer urban streets, old alignments of more prominent highways, or connectors between one or more highways.



List of highways

State Route 171 

The Harry Reid Airport Connector is a limited-access roadway system located in Paradise, an unincorporated town in the Las Vegas Valley, Clark County, Nevada, United States. Composed of State Route 171 (SR 171), the Airport Tunnel and arterial streets, the airport connector provides vehicular access to the passenger terminals at McCarran International Airport. Despite being completely owned by Clark County, the first  of the McCarran Airport Connector is maintained by NDOT as unsigned SR 171, while the remaining section is maintained by Clark County.

State Route 224 

Between July 1976 and 1993, State Route 224 (SR 224) was concurrent with Interstate 80 Business (BL-80) in Nevada. Wendover Boulevard was originally part of U.S. Route 40 (US 40), which connected California to New Jersey via Nevada and Utah. A portion of the Nevada segment is concurrent with U.S. Route 93 Alternate (US 93 Alt.), and the entire portion in Utah is coterminous with State Route 58. The Nevada Department of Transportation (Nevada DOT) applied for the business loop designation in the early 1980s but the designation has never been approved; nevertheless, signs are posted in both states.

State Route 426 

State Route 426 (SR 426) is a short, unsigned state highway in the South Meadows area of Reno in Washoe County, Nevada. It comprises a short segment of South Meadows Parkway.

SR 426 begins at the intersection of South Meadows Parkway and S. Virginia Street (U.S. Route 395 Alternate and U.S. Route 395 Business) in Reno.

Although the state highway section is short, South Meadows Parkway extends further east to serve growing commercial and residential areas of south Reno. Additionally, the road continues southwest past Virginia Street as Foothill Road, providing access to more residential communities.

State Route 578 

State Route 578 (SR 578) is a short state highway in Clark County, Nevada. It comprises a  portion of Washington Avenue in Las Vegas.

State Route 578 begins at the Interstate 15 (I-15) and U.S. Route 93 (US 93) interchange with Washington Avenue, D Street and City Parkway (exits 43 and 44). From there, it follows Washington Avenue eastward, traveling under the Union Pacific Railroad tracks to intersect Main Street. SR 578 passes by the southern Nevada district headquarters of the Nevada Department of Transportation as it heads eastward. The route comes to an end at the Washington Avenue intersection with Las Vegas Boulevard (former SR 604). Located at the intersection of SR 578's eastern terminus are the Grant Sawyer Building (a southern Nevada state office complex), Cashman Center and Cashman Field (home to the Las Vegas Lights FC soccer team) and the Old Las Vegas Mormon Fort State Historic Park (the first permanent settlement in the Las Vegas area).

RTC Transit Routes 104, 119, 208, and 214 function on this road.

SR 578 was established in the 1976 renumbering of Nevada's state highways. The route was designated on July 1, 1976.

State Route 591 

State Route 591 (SR 591) was a state highway that comprised a  section of Spring Mountain Road at Interstate 15.

SR 591 began at the intersection of Spring Mountain Road and Aldebaran Avenue. From there, it proceeded east under Interstate 15 and terminated near Highland Drive. Highland Drive intersects Spring Mountain Road in the form of a ramp from southbound Highland to westbound Spring Mountain, underneath I-15.

As of January 2008, SR 591 had been decommissioned. Although not maintained as a state route, Nevada DOT still maintains the former highway as a frontage road (FR CL 51).

State Route 594 

SR 594 began at Polaris Avenue as a six-lane city street, and extended easterly to meet Interstate 15 at a diamond interchange. The state highway portion of the road continued east and intersected Frank Sinatra Drive to the south before ending at an intersection with Las Vegas Boulevard.

The Nevada Department of Transportation (NDOT) removed SR 594 from its maintenance logs by the beginning of 2019, and has begun the process of turning ownership of the roadway over to Clark County.

State Route 602 

State Route 602 (SR 602) is a short state highway in Clark County, Nevada. Located entirely within the downtown area of Las Vegas, it comprises a small section of Casino Center Boulevard. The route was previously a part of State Route 5B. The highway now primarily serves as a connection between State Route 579 and Interstate 515.

State Route 602 begins at the intersection of Bonanza Road (SR 579) and Casino Center Boulevard near the downtown core of Las Vegas. From there, the route heads south along Casino Center Boulevard, passing underneath the Interstate 515/U.S. Route 93/U.S. Route 95 freeway. Casino Center becomes a one-way street southbound as it passes under the freeway, feeding into the downtown casino district. SR 602 ends at the Casino Center Boulevard intersection with Stewart Avenue.

Casino Center Boulevard was previously part of former State Route 5B, a route that had been established by 1952.

The SR 5B designation was eliminated in the 1976 renumbering of Nevada's state highways. Presumably, State Route 602 was assigned at that time.

State Route 646 

State Route 646 (SR 646) was a very short state highway in Washoe County, Nevada. Previously part of State Route 32A, the route was turned over to local control by 2011. SR 646 comprised an extremely short segment of Prater Way in the city of Sparks.

The route was previously part of the former State Route 32A, a longer route that ran along Prater Way from Victorian Avenue (former U.S. Route 40) to McCarran Boulevard. SR 32A likely became SR 646 with the renumbering of Nevada's state highways in 1976. State Route 646 was removed from Nevada's state highway system by January 2011.

State Route 653 

State Route 653 (SR 653) is an east–west state highway in Washoe County, Nevada, serving the city of Reno.

SR 653 begins at the intersection of Plumb Lane and Kietzke Lane (SR 667) in Reno, and proceeds east along Plumb Lane to end at the intersection with Terminal Way at the entrance to the Reno–Tahoe International Airport.

As late as 2006, the western terminus of SR 653 was at the intersection of Plumb Lane and S. Virginia Street (Business US 395; former SR 430). The route was truncated as of 2008.

State Route 657 

State Route 657 (SR 657) was a state highway in Reno, Nevada that followed a portion of Keystone Avenue. SR 657 was turned over to local control in 2008.

SR 657 was established on July 1, 1976, as part of the 1976 renumbering of Nevada's state highway system. It previously comprised a significant portion of Keystone Avenue, with a routing that extended from the road's SPUI interchange with Interstate 80 north to North McCarran Boulevard (SR 651). The route may have extended as far south as California Avenue at one time.

By 2001, SR 657 had been truncated to the northernmost  near McCarran Boulevard. This short segment was removed from the state highway system by January 2008.

State Route 660 

State Route 660 (SR 660) was a state highway in Reno, Nevada. Prior to its being turned over to local control in 2011, the route encompassed the Sierra Street bridge over Interstate 80 near downtown Reno. SR 660 comprised portions of former State Route 33A.

By the early 2000s, SR 660 ran along Sierra Street from 11th Street to State Route 430 (U.S. 395 Business; Virginia Street).

Control of the Sierra Street bridge was relinquished to the City of Reno on January 11, 2011. SR 660 was completely retired from the state highway system at that time.

State Route 668 

State Route 668 (SR 668) is a short state highway in Washoe County, Nevada. It runs along a small section of Rock Boulevard in Sparks.

State Route 668 begins at the intersection of South Rock Boulevard and Hymer Avenue in an industrial business section of Sparks. The route heads north from there along Rock Boulevard, passing underneath the Union Pacific railroad tracks and interchanging with Interstate 80 (I-80). SR 668 ends after , at its intersection with Victorian Avenue (I-80 Business).

The route was created on July 1, 1976, during the renumbering of Nevada's state highways.

State Route 673 

State Route 673 (SR 673) is a short, unsigned state highway in Washoe County, Nevada. It runs along a short section of Stead Boulevard providing access to the area of Reno known as Stead.

SR 673 begins at the intersection of North Virginia Street (old US 395) northwest of Reno near Stead. The route heads north along Stead Boulevard, passing underneath U.S. Route 395 freeway and ending just past the interchange. Access to the Reno-Stead Airport is located further north along Stead Boulevard.

The SR 673 designation was originally applied on April 27, 1983.

State Route 686 

State Route 686 (SR 686) was a very short state highway in Washoe County, Nevada. It ran from Enterprise Road near the University of Nevada, Reno (UNR) north to North McCarran Boulevard (SR 651) along Evans Avenue. The route was turned over to local control by January 2006.

State Route 705 

State Route 705 (SR 705) is a short  state highway in Douglas County, Nevada. The route follows a portion of Clear Creek Road just south of Carson City. The route was once part of the Lincoln Highway, forming a major travel link between Carson City and Lake Tahoe. SR 705 was designated in 2000, and was only truncated once.

SR 705 begins in Douglas County at the Carson City/Douglas County line southwest Carson City on Clear Creek Road (shown on some maps as "Old Clear Creek Road"), just north of Clear Creek. The state-maintained highway follows Clear Creek Road eastward along the course of Clear Creek for nearly one mile. The road bends around desert hills, and the route (SR 705) ends at the Douglas County/Carson City line, but the road continues eastward to an intersection with U.S. Route 395 (US 395). SR 705 is currently not directly connected to the remainder of Nevada's state highway system.

Trails connecting Lake Tahoe with the Comstock Lode mining region near Carson City had been established in the mid-1800s, with the first wagon road route through Kings Canyon to the north having been constructed by November 1863. This route was eventually selected to become part of the Lincoln Highway and, later, a branch of SR 3.

The advent of the automobile greatly changed this region of Nevada. From 1927 to 1928, aided by both state and forest highway funding, a graded two-lane road was constructed along the corridor of Clear Creek to connect Carson City to Spooner Summit, just east of Glenbrook on the eastern shore of Lake Tahoe. The Clear Creek Road replaced the former Kings Canyon route as the major road to Lake Tahoe in 1928, and was subsequently selected as a later realignment of the Lincoln Highway. Clear Creek Road later became part of US 50, but was bypassed in the 1950s by the current four-lane alignment located a short distance to the north.

Clear Creek Road remained largely unchanged since it was established. The Nevada Department of Transportation initially designated SR 705, from the current western terminus east to a Bureau of Indian Affairs water diversion box in Carson City, by January 11, 2000. By the beginning of 2006, the short portion with Carson City had been removed from state maintenance, resulting in the current highway segment in Douglas County.

State Route 739 

State Route 739 (SR 739) was a short state highway in Clark County, Nevada that provided access to the town of Sloan south of the Las Vegas Valley. The route is no longer a state highway. The route followed a  portion of Sloan Road that ran from the western Interstate 15 right-of-way east to Las Vegas Boulevard.

SR 739 was deleted from the state highway system on June 7, 2010. However, the route is still maintained by the Nevada Department of Transportation as a frontage road.

State Route 760 

State Route 760 (SR 760) is a short state highway in Douglas County, Nevada, United States. It connects Nevada Beach to U.S. Route 50 (US 50). The route was established in 1976.

The route begins just southeast of Elk Point on Lake Tahoe at the intersection of Elk Avenue and the entrance to Nevada Beach, a National Forest Service beach and campground. From there, the route heads easterly along Elks Point Road  to its terminus at US 50 in Round Hill Village just south of Zephyr Cove.

SR 760 was originally designated along Elks Point Road on July 1, 1976.

State Route 781 

State Route 781 (SR 781) is a very short state highway in Palisade, Nevada, that consists solely of a  bridge over the Humboldt River in Palisade Canyon.

State Route 787 

State Route 787 (SR 787) is a very short state highway along a section of Hanson Street in Winnemucca, Nevada, United States. SR 787 primarily serves as a connector road between Interstate 80 Business/U.S. Route 95 (I-80 Bus./US 95) and State Route 294 (SR 294) within the city.

SR 787 begins at an intersection with West Winnemucca Drive (I-80 Bus./US 95). (Hanson Street continues northwest a block before ending at the southwestern end of West 2nd Street. West Winnemucca Boulevard [I-80 Bus./US 95] continues southwest to an interchange with Interstate 80 [I-80] and northwest to both a junction with State Route 289 and then another interchange with I-80.) From its western terminus, SR 787 heads southeast as a three lane road (with a center turn lane) through commercial area for the entire length of the route.

After crossing West 4th Street, SR 787 connects with the southwest end of West 5th Street and then crosses Nixon Street and West 6th Street. The route then traverses a viaduct (that passes over the Union Pacific Railroad  tracks) before reaching its eastern terminus at an intersection with Grass Valley Road (SR 294)/West Haskell Street. From the southern terminus of SR 787, Hanson Street continues easterly before ending at an intersection with South Highland Drive and Water Canyon Road. West Haskell Street heads northeast, running parallel with the southwest side of the railroad tracks, to East Winnemucca Boulevard (I-80 Bus./SR 794), after which East Haskell Street becomes Fairgrounds Road. From that point Grass Valley Road heads southerly through the Grass Valley, passing the community of Grass Valley, and on to the southern part of Pleasant Valley.

State Route 816 

State Route 816 (SR 816) is a  state highway in Lincoln County, Nevada. It runs east from Lincoln County Airport to US 93 near Panaca.

State Route 822 

State Route 822 (SR 822) is a short, east–west highway in Lyon County, Nevada. The route serves the town of Dayton.

The western end of State Route 822 begins at the intersection of U.S. Route 50, Main Street and Dayton Valley Road in Dayton. From there, the route travels eastward  along Dayton Valley Road, crossing over the Carson River. SR 822 reaches its eastern terminus at the intersection of Dayton Valley Road and Ricci Road, although Dayton Valley Road continues eastward. Although it is a short route, an average of 10,000 vehicles per day traveled the highway in 2012.

SR 822 was created on July 1, 1976, in the 1976 renumbering of Nevada's state highways.

State Route 825 

State Route 825 (SR 825) is a state highway in Lyon County, Nevada, United States. It runs along Gage Road from the beginning of pavement eastward to State Route 824 (Day Lane).

State Route 858 

State Route 858 (SR 858) was a short state highway in Pershing County, Nevada. SR 858 began on the west side of Interstate 80 and U.S. Route 95 at the Oreana Interchange (Exit 119). The route crossed under the freeway and ended at the I-80 frontage road on the east side of the interstate. The frontage road (Old US 40) provides access to the town site of Oreana southwest of the interchange.

SR 858 was the southwestern end of former State Route 50. Established by 1935, that route traveled from the Oreana area east and north to Mill City via Rochester. SR 50 was deleted in the 1976 renumbering of Nevada's state highways. In that process, most of the route was renumbered to today's State Route 400, the small southwest end became State Route 858, and the remaining unimproved section of the highway was removed from the state highway system.

The SR 858 designation was removed during the first three months of 2013 and the roadway was re-designated as a frontage road.

State Route 859 

State Route 859 (SR 859) is a former state highway in Pershing County, Nevada, that served the town of Imlay. The route was turned over to local control by 2002. SR 859 began at the Imlay interchange (exit 145) on Interstate 80. The route headed northward , ending in the middle of Imlay.

SR 859 was created in the 1976 renumbering of Nevada's state highway system. The route was removed from the state highway system by January 2002.

State Route 880 

State Route 880 (SR 880) is a short state highway located in Sparks, Nevada.

SR 880 starts at the beginning of state maintenance along Wedekind Road, just east of the Wildcreek Golf Course at the intersection of Malapai Way, near where the Orr Irrigation Ditch crosses the roadway. From there, the route follows Wedekind Road northeasterly through a residential area, paralleling the Orr Ditch. The route then turns southeast on Farr Lane to come to its eastern terminus at an intersection with Pyramid Way (SR 445).

The 1996 NDOT Log included a leg-of-wye from State Route 445 to State Route 880 (Wedekind Road).  State Route 880 formerly existed as part of State Route 33, which extended further south along Wedekind Road and north along SR 445.

See also

References 

State minor
 
Nevada